Bree is a city in the Flemish province of Limburg, Belgium. In December 2021, Bree had a total population of 16,097. The mayor of Bree is Liesbeth van der Auwera. Bree is also known as the jewel of the Campine..

Culture

Cultural center 

 De Zeepziederij, the cultural center of Bree. This center was known till 2019 as the cultural center of De Breughel.

Musea 

 Stadsmuseum Bree, located in the old town hall
 Rijtuigmuseum Bree
 De Gulden Tas, the smallest coffee roastery in Belgium, founded in 1995

Events 

 The yearly Sint-Niklaasmarkt on 5 December, organized from the start of the 17th century
 The yearly Goat market which takes place on the first Monday after the first week of October. Many years ago the best goats were sold here, now it is a folklore-event

Climate 
Climate in this area has mild differences between highs and lows, and there is adequate rainfall year-round. The Köppen Climate Classification subtype for this climate is "Cfb" (Marine West Coast Climate/Oceanic climate).

Demographics 
Bree had a population of 16,097 (7,991 men and 8,106 women) as of 6 December 2021, 9% of the population has a foreign nationality.

Income 
The average income in Bree is €18,659 per year as of 2019.

Notable inhabitants
 Kim Clijsters, tennis player, former WTA number 1
 Lei Clijsters, football player, father of Kim
 Thibaut Courtois, football player for Real Madrid and the Belgium national football team
 Gert Doumen, former football player
 Stefan Everts, motocross racer, 10-time Motocross World Champion
 Johnny Galecki, American actor, born in Bree; raised in the United States
 Bas Leinders, racing driver, tested for the Minardi Formula 1 team in 2004, born in Bree
 Max Verstappen, two time Formula One World Champion driver for Red Bull Racing

Sister cities
Bree is twinned with four cities:
 Geldern, Germany
 Salomó, Spain
 Volpago, Italy
 Yangzhou, China

References

External links

 Official website 

Municipalities of Limburg (Belgium)